Christopher John Reuel Tolkien (21 November 1924 – 16 January 2020) was an English and naturalised French academic editor. The son of author and academic J. R. R. Tolkien, Christopher Tolkien edited much of his father's posthumously published work, including The Silmarillion and the 12-volume (plus one volume of indexes) series The History of Middle-Earth. Tolkien also drew the original maps for his father's The Lord of the Rings.

Outside his father's unfinished works, Christopher Tolkien edited three tales by Geoffrey Chaucer (with Nevill Coghill) and his father's translation of Sir Gawain and the Green Knight.

Early life 
Tolkien was born in Leeds, England, the third of four children and youngest son of John Ronald Reuel and Edith Mary Tolkien (née Bratt). He was educated at the Dragon School in Oxford, and later at The Oratory School.

He entered the Royal Air Force in mid-1943 and was sent to South Africa for flight training, completing the elementary flying course at 7 Air School, Kroonstad, and the service flying course at 25 Air School, Standerton. He was commissioned into the general duties branch of the Royal Air Force Volunteer Reserve on 27 January 1945 as a pilot officer on probation (emergency) and was given the service number 193121. He briefly served as an RAF pilot before transferring to the Royal Navy Volunteer Reserve on 28 June 1945. His commission was confirmed and he was promoted to flying officer (war substantive) on 27 July 1945.

After the war, he studied English at Trinity College, Oxford, taking his B.A. in 1949 and his B.Litt. a few years later.

Career

Tolkien had long been part of the critical audience for his father's fiction, first as a child listening to tales of Bilbo Baggins (which were published as The Hobbit), and then as a teenager and young adult offering much feedback on The Lord of the Rings during its 15-year gestation. He had the task of interpreting his father's sometimes self-contradictory maps of Middle-earth in order to produce the versions used in the books, and he re-drew the main map in the late 1970s to clarify the lettering and correct some errors and omissions. Tolkien was invited by his father to join the Inklings when he was 21 years old, making him the youngest member of the informal literary discussion society that included C. S. Lewis, Owen Barfield, Charles Williams, Warren Lewis, Lord David Cecil, and Nevill Coghill.

He published The Saga of King Heidrek the Wise: "Translated from the Icelandic with Introduction, Notes and Appendices by Christopher Tolkien" in 1960. Later, Tolkien followed in his father's footsteps, becoming a lecturer and tutor in English Language at New College, Oxford, from 1964 to 1975.

In 2016, he was given the Bodley Medal, an award that recognises outstanding contributions to literature, culture, science, and communication.

Editorial work 

His father wrote a great deal of material connected to the Middle-earth legendarium that was not published in his lifetime. J. R. R. Tolkien had originally intended to publish The Silmarillion along with The Lord of the Rings, and parts of it were in a finished state when he died in 1973, but the project was incomplete. Tolkien once referred to his son as his "chief critic and collaborator", and named him his literary executor in his will. The younger Tolkien organised the masses of his father's unpublished writings, some of them written on odd scraps of paper half a century earlier. Much of the material was handwritten; frequently a fair draft was written over a half-erased first draft, and names of characters routinely changed between the beginning and end of the same draft. In the years following, Tolkien worked on the manuscripts and was able to produce an edition of The Silmarillion for publication in 1977 (a very young Guy Gavriel Kay served as his assistant for part of this time).

The Silmarillion was followed by Unfinished Tales in 1980, and The History of Middle-earth in 12 volumes between 1983 and 1996. Most of the original source-texts have been made public from which The Silmarillion was constructed. In April 2007, Tolkien published The Children of Húrin, whose story his father had brought to a relatively complete stage between 1951 and 1957 before abandoning it. This was one of his father's earliest stories, its first version dating back to 1918; several versions are published in The Silmarillion, Unfinished Tales, and The History of Middle-earth. The Children of Húrin is a synthesis of these and other sources. Beren and Lúthien is an editorial work and was published as a stand-alone book in 2017.

The next year, The Fall of Gondolin was published, also as an editorial work. The Children of Húrin, Beren and Lúthien, and The Fall of Gondolin make up the three "Great Tales" of the Elder Days which J. R. R. Tolkien considered to be the biggest stories of the First Age.

HarperCollins published other J. R. R. Tolkien work edited by Christopher that is not connected to the Middle-earth legendarium. The Legend of Sigurd and Gudrún appeared in May 2009, a verse retelling of the Norse Völsung cycle, followed by The Fall of Arthur in May 2013, and by Beowulf: A Translation and Commentary in May 2014.

Tolkien served as chairman of the Tolkien Estate, the entity formed to handle the business side of his father's literary legacy, and as a trustee of the Tolkien Charitable Trust. He resigned as director of the estate in 2017.

Reaction to filmed versions

In 2001, Christopher Tolkien expressed doubts over The Lord of the Rings film trilogy directed by Peter Jackson, questioning the viability of a film interpretation that retained the essence of the work, but stressed that this was just his opinion. In a 2012 interview with Le Monde, he criticised the films, saying: "They gutted the book, making an action film for 15 to 25-year-olds." In 2008, he commenced legal proceedings against New Line Cinema, which he claimed owed his family £80 million in unpaid royalties. In September 2009, he and New Line reached an undisclosed settlement, and he withdrew his legal objection to The Hobbit films.

Personal life
Tolkien was married twice. He had two sons and one daughter.  

His first marriage in 1951 was to sculptor Faith Lucy Tilly Tolkien (née Faulconbridge) (1928–2017). After their separation in 1964, they divorced in 1967. Her work is featured in the National Portrait gallery. Their son is barrister and novelist Simon Mario Reuel Tolkien.

Christopher Tolkien and Baillie Tolkien (née Klass) married in 1967. In 1975 they moved to the French countryside where she edited her father-in-law's The Father Christmas Letters for posthumous publication. They had two children, Adam Reuel Tolkien and Rachel Clare Reuel Tolkien. 

In the wake of a dispute surrounding the making of The Lord of the Rings film trilogy, Christopher is said to have disapproved of the views of his son, Simon Tolkien. Christopher felt that The Lord of the Rings was "peculiarly unsuitable for transformation into visual dramatic form" whilst his son became involved as an advisor with the series. They later reconciled, with Simon dedicating one of his novels to his father. 

Christopher Tolkien died on 16 January 2020, at the age of 95, in Draguignan, Var, France.

Bibliography

As author or translator

"Introduction" to G. Turville-Petre, Hervarar saga ok Heiðreks (Viking Society for Northern Research, 1956, corrected reprint 1976), pp. xi-xx.
, from the Icelandic Hervarar saga ok Heiðreks

As editor

References

External links

 
 

1924 births
2020 deaths
English book editors
English illustrators
Alumni of Trinity College, Oxford
Inklings
Fellows of New College, Oxford
People educated at The Dragon School
Royal Air Force officers
Royal Air Force pilots of World War II
English Roman Catholics
Tolkien Society members
Christopher
British emigrants to France
Royal Air Force Volunteer Reserve personnel of World War II
Tolkien studies
English people of German descent
Royal Naval Volunteer Reserve personnel of World War II
Royal Navy officers of World War II
Military personnel from Leeds